John Mackenzie (21 September 1876 – 9 December 1949) was a Scottish sailor who competed for the Royal Clyde Yacht Club at the 1908 Summer Olympics. Mackenzie was born in Greenock.

He was a crew member of the Scottish boat Hera, which won the gold medal in the 12-metre class.

References

External links 
 
 

1876 births
1949 deaths
Sportspeople from Greenock
Scottish Olympic medallists
Scottish male sailors (sport)
Sailors at the 1908 Summer Olympics – 12 Metre
Olympic sailors of Great Britain
British male sailors (sport)
Olympic gold medallists for Great Britain
Olympic medalists in sailing
Medalists at the 1908 Summer Olympics